Lakers Public School & College, commonly known as LPSC, is a private school located in Kathaltoli, Rangamati, Bangladesh. It is managed by the Bangladesh Army, Rangamati Cantonment, Rangamati. The school was established in 1991. It targets pupils from the Bangladesh armed forces and civilian communities in Rangamati city, especially those living in the Rangamati area and its periphery. A substantial proportion of its students are from civilian backgrounds.

The lack of educational services in the English medium for defence officers was a prominent reason the school was established.

History
LPS started its functions in hired accommodation at Kalindipur under the principalship of Begum Rukhshana Amin, with 60 students and 7 teachers. The local government council in Rangamati allotted  of khash land at Kathaltali on which the ground floor of the present school building was constructed and started with 7 classes from nursery to Std V from 1 September 1995.

Principals names

Curriculum

National Section
For the national curriculum the students take the Secondary School Certificate SSC examinations. The students follow the textbooks, translated in English, of the National Board of Intermediate and Secondary Education in Bangladesh.

Uniform
Boys wear white shirts with navy blue trousers, elementary boys wear shorts instead.
Girls wear white salwar kameez and blue kamiz.

Facilities

Library
Students spend their Library classes and free periods in the school library, located on the fifth and topmost floor. The library contains textbooks, novels, references, encyclopedias and Army periodicals. It maintains an archive of English daily newspapers. Students, from Class Five onwards, may borrow books from the library.

See also
 List of schools in Bangladesh

References

Schools in Rangamati Hill District
Education in Bangladesh
1991 establishments in Bangladesh
Educational Institutions affiliated with Bangladesh Army